Joshua McGuire (born 1987) is a British television, film and stage actor. He is perhaps best known for his role as Angus in the Channel 4/Netflix comedy series Lovesick (previously known as Scrotal Recall). He starred opposite Daniel Radcliffe in Rosencrantz and Guildenstern Are Dead at The Old Vic. He portrayed Briar Cudgeon in the film Artemis Fowl.

Early life and education
McGuire was born in 1987 and brought up in the town of Warwick in Warwickshire. McGuire was educated at Warwick School, a boarding and day independent school for boys in his home town, followed by the Royal Academy of Dramatic Art, in Bloomsbury in Central London, from which he graduated with a BA (Hons) in Acting.

Life and career
Prior to graduation, McGuire had been a member of Playbox Theatre Company, and was involved in minor radio dramas and Shakespearean productions. While still a drama student, he first came to attention for his role in the premiere of Laura Wade's satirical play Posh in which he portrayed Guy Bellingfield, a student member of the "Riot Club", a parody of the Bullingdon Club at Oxford University.

McGuire made guest appearances on a number of BBC shows. He also starred as assistant to Stephen Fry's character in the comedy series The Bleak Old Shop of Stuff, a parody of Charles Dickens' works.

McGuire played Rory in Richard Curtis's film About Time. In May 2016, McGuire played the role of Nunney in the BBC drama Love, Nina.

Filmography

Theatre

References

External links

RADA Profile

1987 births
Living people
Alumni of RADA
English male film actors
English male television actors
21st-century English male actors
English male stage actors
English male child actors
People educated at Warwick School
Date of birth missing (living people)